In the United States, Grade A milk, also called fluid grade milk, refers to milk produced under sufficiently sanitary conditions to qualify for fluid (beverage) consumption.  Only Grade A milk is regulated under federal milk marketing orders. Grade B milk (also referred to as manufacturing grade milk) does not meet fluid grade standards and can only be used in cheese, butter and nonfat dry milk. More than 90% of all milk produced nationally is Grade A, and much of the Grade A milk supply is used in manufactured dairy products.

See also
Grade A Pasteurized Milk Ordinance

References 

United States Department of Agriculture
Cow milk